Neocollyris aureofusca is a species of ground beetle in the genus Neocollyris in the family Carabidae. It was described by Bates in 1889.

References

Aureofusca, Neocollyris
Beetles described in 1889